AIIC may refer to:

 International Association of Conference Interpreters
 Quorum-quenching N-acyl-homoserine lactonase, an enzyme